Gustavo Sondermann (February 17, 1982 – April 3, 2011) was a Brazilian racing driver.

Career
Sondermann began racing karts at the age of sixteen and soon moved up to the Brazilian Formula Renault championship for 2002, in which he competed for two years with mixed results.  In 2004 he moved to Europe to compete in the equivalent British series, and also made a guest appearance in the Formula Renault Eurocup the following year, but subsequently returned to Brazil in 2006 to compete in the national stock car championship.

He competed in the second tier of the series, known variously as Stock Car Light, Stock Car Copa Vicar and latterly as the Copa Chevrolet Montana from 2006 until 2011, winning four races in total and with a best finish of third place in the championship in 2007, a year soured by the death of his team-mate, Rafael Sperafico, in the season finale. In 2010, he competed in seven races of the premier Stock Car Brasil division, scoring six points and finishing in 31st place in the championship.  He also competed in the third-tier Mini Challenge series, the GT4 Brasil Championship and the Pick Up Racing Brasil series, winning the last of these in 2008.

Death
During the first race of the 2011 Copa Chevrolet Montana season, held in heavy rain at the Autódromo José Carlos Pace, Sondermann was hit by several cars and ultimately by Pedro Boesel at the fast Curva do Café before the start-finish straight. He was extricated from his car and transferred to hospital in a coma after having had cardiac arrest, where he later was diagnosed brain-dead. His organs were donated.

References

External links
Sondermann's Twitter page

1982 births
2011 deaths
Brazilian people of German descent
Brazilian racing drivers
Brazilian Formula Renault 2.0 drivers
British Formula Renault 2.0 drivers
Formula Renault Eurocup drivers
Stock Car Brasil drivers
Racing drivers who died while racing
Sport deaths in Brazil
Filmed deaths in motorsport
Comtec Racing drivers